On ne change pas (meaning We do not change or One does not change) is the first comprehensive French-language greatest hits album by Canadian singer Celine Dion, released by Columbia Records on 30 September 2005. It features songs recorded between 1981 and 2005, including three new tracks, all of which were released as singles: "Je ne vous oublie pas", "Tous les secrets" and "I Believe in You" (duet with Il Divo). "Je ne vous oublie pas" reached number two in France and was certified Silver. The other singles peaked at numbers twenty and thirty, respectively. On ne change pas received positive reviews from music critics. It reached number one in France and Belgium Wallonia, and number two in Canada and Switzerland. On ne change pas was certified 3× Platinum in France and Canada, Platinum in Belgium and Gold in Switzerland. In 2009, it was re-released under the title Best of – 3 CD (sometimes promoted as Triple Best Of).

Background
On 7 July 2005, celinedion.com announced that a new album featuring Dion's French-language greatest hits was to be released in October 2005. The two-CD compilation titled On ne change pas was to contain as yet unreleased material, including the first single written by Jacques Veneruso, "Je ne vous oublie pas". On 22 August 2005, the track listing for On ne change pas was announced and the album was scheduled for release on 3 October 2005 in Europe and 4 October 2005 in North America. However, in some European countries, On ne change pas was released on 30 September 2005. The music video for "Je ne vous oublie pas" premiered on television on 31 August 2005. It was filmed at the Royal Impérial Theatre in Montreal, Quebec, Canada on 29 July 2005 and directed by Didier Kerbrat who already worked with Dion on the video for "Contre Nature" in 2004.

Content

Sony Music Entertainment released different versions of the album but all of them include three new songs: "Je ne vous oublie pas", "Tous les secrets" and "I Believe in You" (duet with Il Divo). The standard edition was issued on two CDs in a jewel case and the collector's edition digipak contains also a bonus DVD with thirty minutes of exclusive images and the music video for "Je ne vous oublie pas". The North American edition includes Dion's French-language hits form the 1990s and 2000s, but also focuses heavily on the songs form the 1980s which made her a star in Quebec, beginning with the 1981 debut single, "Ce n'était qu'un rêve". The European edition features mostly songs which became popular in France and also contains some rare tracks. It includes hits like "Pour que tu m'aimes encore", "Je sais pas", "Un garçon pas comme les autres (Ziggy)", "Tout l'or des hommes", "S'il suffisait d'aimer" and "D'amour ou d'amitié", but also the number-one single "Sous le vent", which was available on Garou's debut album only, and "Ma Nouvelle-France" recorded for the 2004 film, Battle of the Brave (Nouvelle-France). In November 2005, the ultimate edition was released in Europe and Canada, containing three CDs and a bonus DVD in a longbox. It features fifty songs recorded between 1981 and 2005, including all the French-language hits and various rare tracks. In late March 2006, the one-disc edition was issued in Europe and Canada featuring nineteen greatest hits on one CD. An accompanying On ne change pas DVD was also released in November 2005, including Dion's French music videos and a bonus material. In November 2009, Best of – 3 CD (sometimes promoted as Triple Best Of) was released in Francophone countries in Europe containing three CDs from the ultimate edition.

Promotion
In Canada, Dion appeared on Star Académie on 2 October 2005 and sang "Je ne vous oublie pas" live from Las Vegas with the contestants in the studio. On 11 December 2005, she performed "Je ne vous oublie pas" on the Canadian show L'école des fans and sang few duets with the children. Dion also visited France in early October 2005, during her break from A New Day..., and recorded various television appearances. On 7 October 2005, she appeared on Star Academy and sang "Je ne vous oublie pas" and two of her hits with the contestants: "Pour que tu m'aimes encore" and "On ne change pas". This episode of Star Academy became the most watched television program of the French prime-time by attracting an average of 7,820,800 viewers and getting the 36,8% share with a summit of 9,080,000 viewers during the "Pour que tu m'aimes encore" performance. Dion also sang "Je ne vous oublie pas" on Au Nom des Autres on 10 October 2005 and on Hit Machine on 15 October 2005. On 5 November 2005, she performed few songs on Les 500 Choristes Ensemble, including "Je ne vous oublie pas", "I Believe in You" with Il Divo, "S'il suffisait d'aimer", "Pour que tu m'aimes encore" and "L'envie" with Johnny Hallyday. The show became the most watched television program of the French prime-time by attracting an average of 7,870,720 viewers and getting the 36,7 % share, setting a record for Les 500 Choristes Ensemble. Some of Dion songs were featured on two of Les 500 Choristes albums: 500 Choristes Avec.../Vol.1 (2005) and 500 Choristes Avec.../Vol.2 (2006). On 25 December 2005, she performed "I Believe in You" with Il Divo on Vivement Dimanche and on 27 December 2005, she sang "Je ne vous oublie pas" on Les Disques D'or. Later, on 29 December 2005, Dion performed three songs on the Symphonic Show, including "Je ne vous oublie pas", "I Believe in You" with Il Divo and "Le blues du businessman". Finally, the performance of "Tous les secrets" on Hit Machine, recorded in October 2005, was shown on 1 April 2006.

Singles

The first single, "Je ne vous oublie pas" was released on CD in France, Belgium and Switzerland on 10 October 2005, a week after the album. It included instrumental version of the song and "Sous le vent" recorded with Les 500 Choristes. The single debuted and peaked at number two, being held from the number-one position by Crazy Frog's hit, "Popcorn". "Je ne vous oublie pas" was certified Silver in France.

"Tous les secrets" had its worldwide premiere on 1 September 2005 in Poland, ahead of any French-speaking country. The song gathered great reviews and became a very successful single reaching no. 1 on RMF FM. Alas, it was the first and only single from On ne change pas in Poland.  Then, in Spring 2006 it was released as a second single in Francophone territories and vwas featured in an animated movie, Asterix and the Vikings. The music video with the fragments from the film premiered on 27 February 2006. "Tous les secrets" CD single was issued in Francophone countries in Europe on 13 March 2006 and included English-language version of the song, titled "Let Your Heart Decide". The music video for "Let Your Heart Decide" was also released. Both versions of the song were featured on the film's soundtrack and the music videos were included on the Asterix and the Vikings DVD. "Tous les secrets" reached number twenty in France.

The third single, "I Believe in You" (duet with Il Divo) was released on a CD in France and Switzerland on 1 May 2005. The single contained another track from Il Divo, "Hasta Mi Final". Both songs were included on Il Divo's album, Ancora. The song reached number thirty in France and in June 2006, it was featured on the official 2006 FIFA World Cup album, called Voices from the FIFA World Cup. "I Believe in You" was also released in January 2006 in the United States as a promotional single from Ancora and reached number thirty-one on the Billboards Adult Contemporary chart.

Critical reception

The album met with positive reviews. According to Rob Theakston from AllMusic, "On ne change pas is without no doubt a companion piece to 1999's All the Way... A Decade of Song. Dion amassed quite a back catalog of the French-language hits ranging from dance-pop-friendly numbers to her familiar ground of passionate, melodramatic ballads. For those unfamiliar with this portion of her career (or for those who don't speak French), getting past the roadblock of not being able to understand the subject material will lead to a greater, more holistic appreciation of the depth and prolific output of her career in such a short span...On the plus side there are a few new tracks including her duet with Il Divo, "I Believe in You" (duet with Il Divo)".

Commercial performance
In Canada, On ne change pas debuted at number two selling 34,000 copies. In the second week, the album stayed at number two, which became its peak position, with sales of 16,000 units. In January 2006, On ne change pas was certified 3× Platinum in Canada for shipment of 300,000 copies. The album also topped the chart in Quebec for three weeks. In France, it stayed at the top for seven consecutive weeks and became the best selling compilation album in 2005. In the first week, it sold 109,000 copies and the next week 71,000 units. On ne change pas was certified 3× Platinum in France and has sold over 790,000 copies there. The album also peaked at number one for three consecutive weeks in Belgium Wallonia and number two in Switzerland, and was certified Platinum in Belgium and Gold in Switzerland.

Accolades

In 2005, Dion received Chérie FM Star - Honorary Award. In 2006, she was nominated for two Félix Awards: Female Vocalist of the Year and Most Popular Song of the Year ("Je ne vous oublie pas"). Dion was also nominated for the NRJ Music Award for Francophone Female Artist of the Year.

Track listingNotes'''
  signifies an additional producer

Personnel

Olivia Ada Seba – background vocals
F. Andresson – engineer, mix
R. Auclair – engineer's assistant
Jean-Philippe Audin – cello
J. Bengtsson – flute
M. Berntoft – guitars
Carl Björsell – guitars, engineer, background vocals
Thierry Blanchard – strings arranger
Nathalie Carlucci – viola
Herve Cavelier – violin
Marie-Céline Chroné – background vocals
H. Colau – background vocals
L. Colau – background vocals
Laurent Coppola – drums
Hélène Corbellari – violin
C. Dauphin – viola
G. Feuillette – background vocals
Humberto Gatica – engineer
Emmanuel Guerrero – piano, strings arranger
Patrick Hampartzoumian – producer, engineer, mix
Jean Marc Haroutiounian – bass
Nana Hedin – background vocals
Florence Hennequin – cello
Il Divo – lead vocals
U. & H. Janson – conductor
David Kreuger – producer, arranger, programming
François Lalonde – engineer's assistant
Kristian Lundin – producer, arranger, programming, mix, background vocals
Per Magnusson – producer, arranger, keyboards
S. Makasso – background vocals
Z. Makasso – background vocals
C. Maubourguet – violin
J. Mbida – background vocals
A. M. Rakotofiringa – background vocals
G. Seba – choral director
Michel L. Seba – background vocals
Stockholm Orchestra - orchestra
Didrik Thott – background vocals
Sebastian Thott – guitars, engineer
Jacques Veneruso – producer, guitars

Charts

Weekly charts

Year-end charts

Certifications and sales

Best Of – 3 CD
In 2009, Best Of – 3 CD was released in Francophone countries in Europe containing three CDs from the ultimate edition of On ne change pas''.

Release history

References

External links
 

2005 greatest hits albums
Celine Dion compilation albums